Basal Eurasian is a proposed lineage of anatomically modern humans with reduced, or zero, archaic hominin (Neanderthal) admixture compared to other ancient non-Africans. Basal Eurasians represent a sister lineage to other Eurasians and may have originate from the Southern Middle East, specifically the Arabian peninsula, or North Africa, and are said to have contributed ancestry to various West Eurasian, South Asian, and Central Asian groups. This hypothetical population was proposed to explain the lower archaic admixture among modern West Eurasians compared to with East Eurasians, although alternatives without the need of such Basal lineage exist as well.

Description

A study by Lazaridis et al. in 2014 demonstrated that modern Europeans can be modelled as an admixture of three ancestral populations; Ancient North Eurasians (ANE), Western Hunter-Gatherers (WHG), and Early European Farmers (EEF). This same study also showed that EEFs harbour ancestry from a hypothetical 'ghost' population which the authors name 'Basal Eurasians'. This group, who have not yet been sampled from ancient remains, are thought to have diverged from all non-African populations c. 60,000 to 100,000 years ago, before non-Africans admixed with Neanderthals (c. 50,000 to 60,000 years ago) and diversified from each other. A second study by Lazaridis et al. in 2016 found that populations with higher levels of Basal Eurasian ancestry have lower levels of Neanderthal ancestry, which suggests that Basal Eurasians had lower levels of Neanderthal ancestry compared with other non-Africans. Another study by Ferreira et al. in 2021 suggested that Basal Eurasians diverged from other Eurasians between 50,000 to 60,000 years ago, and lived somewhere in the Arabian peninsula, specifically the Arab-Persian Gulf region, shortly before proper Eurasians admixed with a Neanderthal population in a region stretching from the Levant to northern Iran.

In modern populations, Neanderthal ancestry is around 10% to 20% lower in West Eurasians than East Eurasians, with intermediate levels found in South and Central Asian populations. Although a scenario involving multiple admixture events between modern humans and Neanderthals is an alternative possibility, the most likely explanation for this is that Neanderthal ancestry in West Eurasians and South and Central Asians was diluted by admixture with Basal Eurasian groups.

Possible geographic origins

Basal Eurasians may have originated in a region stretching from North Africa to the Middle East, before admixing with West-Eurasian populations. North Africa has been described as a strong candidate for the location of the emergence of Basal Eurasians by Loosdrecht et al. in 2018. Ferreira et al. in 2021 traced back the point of origin for Basal Eurasians into the Middle East, specifically in the Arab-Persian Gulf region on the Arab peninsula. As Basal Eurasians had low levels of Neanderthal ancestry, genetic and archaeological evidence for interactions beteeen modern humans and Neanderthals may allow certain areas, such as the Levant, to be ruled out as possible sources for Basal Eurasians. In other areas, such as southern Southwest Asia, there is currently no evidence for an overlap between modern human and Neanderthal populations.

Estimated Basal Eurasian ancestry in other populations

An estimation for Holocene-era Near Easterners (e.g., Mesolithic Caucasian Hunter Gatherers, Mesolithic Iranians, Neolithic Iranians, Natufians) suggests that they formed from up to 50% Basal Eurasian ancestry, with the remainder being closer to Ancient North Eurasians.

The Ancient North African Taforalt individuals were found to have harbored ~65% West-Eurasian-like ancestry and considered likely direct descendants of such "Basal Eurasian" population. However they were shown to be genetically closer Holocene-era Iranians and Levantine populations, which already harbored increased archaic (Neanderthal) admixture.

Early European Farmers (EEFs), who had some Western European Hunter-Gatherer-related ancestry and originated in the Near East, also derive approximately 44% of their ancestry from this hypothetical Basal Eurasian lineage.

According to one study, Basal-Eurasian ancestry peaks among Eastern Arabs (Qataris) and Iranian populations, at 45% and 35% respectively, and is also found in significant amounts among Ancient Iberomarusian samples and modern Northern Africans, in accordance with the Arabian branch of West-Eurasian diversity, which expanded into Northern and Northeastern Africa between 30-15 thousand years ago.

References

Sources

 

 

 

 

 

 

 

 

 

Archaeogenetic lineages
Natufian culture